The Play-offs of the 2005 Fed Cup Europe/Africa Zone Group II were the final stages of the Group I Zonal Competition involving teams from Europe and Africa. Using the positions determined in their pools, the sixteen teams faced off to determine their placing in the 2005 Fed Cup Europe/Africa Zone Group II. The top two teams advanced to Group I, and the bottom two teams were relegated down to the Group III for the next year.

Promotion play-offs
The top two teams of each pool were placed against each other in two head-to-head rounds. The winner of the rounds advanced to Group I for next year.

Romania vs. Latvia

Finland vs. Georgia

Relegation play-offs
The last placed teams of each pool were placed against each other in two ties. The losing team of the rounds were relegated to Group III for next year.

Lithuania vs. Norway

Tunisia vs. Ireland

Final Placements

  and  advanced to the Europe/Africa Zone Group I for the next year. The Romanians placed second in their pool of five, while the Finns placed last in their pool of four and thus faced relegation back to Group II for 2007.
The Norwegians and Tunisians respectively placed first and third in the same pool of five, meaning that Tunisia would remain in Group III for 2007, while Norway would advance back to Group II.

See also
Fed Cup structure

References

External links
 Fed Cup website

2005 Fed Cup Europe/Africa Zone